The 2010 Wimbledon Championships are described below in detail, in the form of day-by-day summaries.

Day 1 (21 June)
Seeds out:
 Gentlemen's Singles:  Marin Čilić [11],  Ivan Ljubičić [17],  Stan Wawrinka [20],  Tommy Robredo [30]
 Ladies' Singles:  Francesca Schiavone [5],  Kateryna Bondarenko [34]
Schedule of play

Day 2 (22 June)
Seeds out:
 Gentlemen's Singles:  Fernando Verdasco [8],  Juan Carlos Ferrero [14],  Nicolás Almagro [19],  Marcos Baghdatis [24]
 Ladies' Singles:  Samantha Stosur [6],  Lucie Šafářová [25]
Schedule of play

Day 3 (23 June)
Seeds out:
 Gentlemen's Singles:  Nikolay Davydenko [7]
 Ladies' Singles:  Shahar Pe'er [13],  Yaroslava Shvedova [30],  Melanie Oudin [33]
 Gentlemen's Doubles:  Łukasz Kubot /  Oliver Marach [5]
Schedule of play

Day 4 (24 June)
Seeds out:
 Ladies' Singles:  Aravane Rezaï [18],  Svetlana Kuznetsova [19],  Zheng Jie [23],  Daniela Hantuchová [24]
 Gentlemen's Doubles:  Mardy Fish /  Mark Knowles [13]
 Ladies' Doubles:  Chan Yung-jan /  Zheng Jie [9]
Schedule of play

Day 5 (25 June)
Seeds out:
 Gentlemen's Singles:  Mikhail Youzhny [13],  Gaël Monfils [21],  Feliciano López [22],  John Isner [23],  Albert Montañés [28],  Philipp Kohlschreiber [29],  Victor Hănescu [31]
 Ladies' Singles:  Nadia Petrova [12],  Yanina Wickmayer [15],  Alisa Kleybanova [26],  Maria Kirilenko [27],  Alona Bondarenko [28]
 Gentlemen's Doubles:  Lukáš Dlouhý /  Leander Paes [3],  František Čermák /  Michal Mertiňák [9]
 Ladies' Doubles:  Maria Kirilenko /  Agnieszka Radwańska [10],  Alicja Rosolska /  Yan Zi [15]
Schedule of play

Day 6 (26 June)
Seeds out:
 Gentlemen's Singles:  Thomaz Bellucci [25],  Gilles Simon [26],  Philipp Petzschner [33]
 Ladies' Singles:  Flavia Pennetta [10],  Victoria Azarenka [14],  Anastasia Pavlyuchenkova [29],  Alexandra Dulgheru [31],  Sara Errani [32]
 Gentlemen's Doubles:  Daniel Nestor /  Nenad Zimonjić [1],  Mariusz Fyrstenberg /  Marcin Matkowski [6],  Marcelo Melo /  Bruno Soares [15]
 Ladies' Doubles:  Vera Dushevina /  Ekaterina Makarova [13],  Monica Niculescu /  Shahar Pe'er [14],  Chuang Chia-jung /  Olga Govortsova [17]
 Mixed Doubles:  Mahesh Bhupathi /  Liezel Huber [3],  Oliver Marach /  Nuria Llagostera Vives [4],  Robert Lindstedt /  Ekaterina Makarova [13]
Schedule of play

Middle Sunday (27 June)
Middle Sunday in Wimbledon is traditionally a rest day, without any play, and this was the case in 2010.

Day 7 (28 June)
Seeds out:
 Gentlemen's Singles:  Andy Roddick [5],  David Ferrer [9],  Lleyton Hewitt [15],  Jürgen Melzer [16],  Sam Querrey [18],  Julien Benneteau [32]
 Ladies' Singles:  Caroline Wozniacki [3],  Jelena Janković [4],  Agnieszka Radwańska [7],  Marion Bartoli [11],  Maria Sharapova [16],  Justine Henin [17],
 Gentlemen's Doubles:  Mahesh Bhupathi /  Max Mirnyi [4],  Julian Knowle /  Andy Ram [8],  Simon Aspelin /  Paul Hanley [10]
 Ladies' Doubles:  Nadia Petrova /  Samantha Stosur [3],  Cara Black /  Daniela Hantuchová [11],  Hsieh Su-wei /  Alla Kudryavtseva [16]
 Mixed Doubles:  Andy Ram /  Elena Vesnina [15],  Marcin Matkowski /  Tathiana Garbin [16]
Schedule of play

Day 8 (29 June)
Seeds out:
 Ladies' Singles:  Venus Williams [2],  Kim Clijsters [8],  Li Na [9]
 Gentlemen's Doubles:  Marcel Granollers /  Tommy Robredo [11],  Julien Benneteau /  Michaël Llodra [14]
 Ladies' Doubles:  Iveta Benešová /  Barbora Záhlavová-Strýcová [12]
 Mixed Doubles:  Daniel Nestor /  Bethanie Mattek-Sands [6],  Max Mirnyi /  Alisa Kleybanova [8]
Schedule of play

Day 9 (30 June)
Seeds out:
 Gentlemen's Singles:  Roger Federer [1],  Robin Söderling [6],  Jo-Wilfried Tsonga [10]
 Gentlemen's Doubles:  Bob Bryan /  Mike Bryan [2]
 Ladies' Doubles:  Serena Williams /  Venus Williams [1],  Květa Peschke /  Katarina Srebotnik [6],  Lisa Raymond /  Rennae Stubbs [7]
 Mixed Doubles:  Nenad Zimonjić /  Samantha Stosur [1],  Mark Knowles /  Katarina Srebotnik [5],  Mariusz Fyrstenberg /  Yan Zi [8]
Schedule of play

Day 10 (1 July)
Seeds out:
 Gentlemen's Doubles:  Wesley Moodie /  Dick Norman [7]
 Mixed Doubles:  Paul Hanley /  Chan Yung-jan [12]
Schedule of play

Day 11 (2 July)
Seeds out:
 Gentlemen's Singles:  Novak Djokovic [3],  Andy Murray [4]
 Ladies' Doubles:  Gisela Dulko /  Flavia Pennetta [4],  Liezel Huber /  Bethanie Mattek-Sands [5]
 Mixed Doubles:  Lukáš Dlouhý /  Iveta Benešová [9],  Marcelo Melo /  Rennae Stubbs [10]
Schedule of play

Day 12 (3 July)
Seeds out:
 Ladies' Singles:  Vera Zvonareva [21]
 Gentlemen's Doubles:  Robert Lindstedt /  Horia Tecău [16]
Schedule of play

Day 13 (4 July)
Seeds out:
 Gentlemen's Singles:  Tomáš Berdych [12]
 Mixed Doubles:  Wesley Moodie /  Lisa Raymond [11]
Schedule of play

Wimbledon Championships by year – Day-by-day summaries